Dennis Walter Argall (born 7 July 1943) is a retired Australian diplomat and senior career officer with the Department of Foreign Affairs and Trade (DFAT). He was Australia’s Ambassador to China from 1984 until 1985.

Biography
Argall was born in Newcastle, New South Wales. His father worked for the Commonwealth Bank of Australia and he grew up in Newcastle, Sydney, and Maryborough before returning to Sydney. He attended Newington College (1955–1959) on a scholarship and completed a Bachelor of Arts degree with honours in anthropology at the University of Sydney.

Argall in 1964 married Pamela Orr.  Their two children, Susan and Simon, were born in Manila, Philippines (1966) and in Canberra Australia (1967) respectively. The marriage broke up in Rome in 1969. In 1974 Argall married Margaret Gray (1949- 2001). They had three children: Nicholas (who attended his first political demonstration at two weeks of age at Parliament House, Canberra, on 11 November 1975), Elizabeth (1980) and Catherine (1983). Margaret was a career diplomat whose career also led into other areas of government and school administration. As founding secretary of the Canberra Montessori Society she lobbied successfully for a Montessori School to be established within the ACT public schools system. Margaret was killed in 2001 by a brain tumour.

Since 2009, Argall has been partner of Helen Backhouse, for many years a leading figure in the community service sector in the Illawarra and Shoalhaven areas of Australia. They live in North Nowra, Australia.

Career

Argall joined the Department of External Affairs (which later became the Department of Foreign Affairs) in January 1964.  He was posted to Manila (1965-1967), Rome (1968-1969), and Washington DC (1976-1978) where he was Counsellor, later acting Minister. From 1972 to 1974 he worked in a policy area of the Department of Defence and then as Assistant Secretary in the Department of the Special Minister of State.

In 1978 and 1979 he was senior advisor to Lionel Bowen MP, deputy leader of the Australian Labor Party in the Australian Parliament, before returning to Foreign Affairs as Assistant Secretary North Asia. Argall was later acting head of the North and South Asia Division in 1982 and 1983.

Argall was Ambassador to China in 1984-1985.

Later activities

Illness shortened Argall's appointment in Beijing. He completed a master's degree in defence studies at the University of New South Wales College in the Australian Defence Force Academy in 1988, with a minor thesis analysing decisions made by the Australian cabinet about the relationship with China in 1980. Though returning to work for a time as head of research in the Commonwealth Parliamentary Library, Argall's health deteriorated again, much later diagnosed as Chronic Fatigue Syndrome and fibromyalgia, factors preventing return to regular work. In pursuit of rehabilitation he for a time secured organic registration of a very small fruit farm near Bodalla New South Wales with the National Association for Sustainable Agriculture Australia (NASAA) and a permaculture designer's certificate, to personal and but not financial advantage.

In 2003 and 2004 Argall gave speeches critical of the Australian Government's entry into war with Iraq comparing events with the beginnings of World War 1 and expecting comparable unravelling of violence.

He has subsequently sought to assist communities in Africa with developing practical business plans for development. In 2008, he ran for mayor of the City of Shoalhaven.

His papers, from the period 1984 until 1988, are held by the National Library of Australia. These include writing on the 1980 Cabinet decision that gave direction to Australia's modern relationship with China and the complex of issues at the end of 1975, during turbulent last days of the Whitlam Government concerning the 'Korean Question' at the United Nations and the sudden departure of all of the staff of the embassy of the DPRK from Canberra.

References

1943 births
Living people
People educated at Newington College
University of Sydney alumni
Australian diplomats